Gunda subnotata is a species of moth in the family Bombycidae. It was described by Francis Walker in 1859. It is found in Singapore and on Peninsular Malaysia, Sumatra, Borneo and Palawan. The habitat consists of both montane and lowland areas.

References

Moths described in 1859
Bombycidae